Pignataro Maggiore is a comune (municipality) in the Province of Caserta in the Italian region Campania, located about  north of Naples and about  northwest of Caserta.

Pignataro Maggiore borders the following municipalities: Calvi Risorta, Francolise, Giano Vetusto, Grazzanise, Pastorano, Sparanise, Vitulazio.

Twin towns
 Sault, France

References

External links
Official website

Cities and towns in Campania